DIII can refer to:

 Division 3
 Diablo 3
 503 in Roman numerals

Technology
 DIII-D (tokamak), a tokamak located at San Diego, California.
 Mercedes D.III

Aircraft
 Pfalz D.III
 Albatros D.III
 Fokker D.III
 Siemens-Schuckert D.III